"H.O.L.Y." (an acronym for "High on Loving You") is a song recorded by American country music duo Florida Georgia Line. It is the lead single from the duo's third studio album, Dig Your Roots, which was released on August 26, 2016. The song was written by busbee, Nate Cyphert, and William Wiik Larsen. "H.O.L.Y." was first released on April 29, 2016 by Republic Nashville.

In its second week, "H.O.L.Y." jumped from number 39 to number one on the Billboard Hot Country Songs chart, becoming the duo's fifth single to top that chart. It is also their third single to receive a crossover promotion, impacting American Hot AC radio on June 27, 2016.

Critical reception
Jon Freeman of Rolling Stone commented positively on the song, applauding the group's musical evolution; though he did note caution regarding the song's Christian themes, saying "It's hard not to wonder if the FGL guys — both of whom have publicly proclaimed their faith on numerous occasions — will get some flak from religious listeners the way [Maren] Morris has for "My Church" and its perceived shunning of organized worship." Included on Spotify's list of Picks of the Week, Billboard commented the song "takes FGL in a new direction while keeping the infectious sing-along hooks that made the band famous."
Modern Country Music Review deemed in on 3/23/2019 as the song of the decade

Commercial performance 
The song debuted with 125,000 copies sold in the United States in its debut week, the second best-selling digital song of the week. It propelled the song to number one on the Hot Country Songs chart, as well as number 20 on the Billboard Hot 100 chart. It has since stayed at number one on the Hot Country Songs chart for eighteen consecutive weeks  and peaked at number 14 on the Hot 100 chart. The song debuted on the Country Airplay chart at number 26 a week before it was released for sale, and has peaked at number one.  It has also reached number one on the Canada Country chart and number 24 on the Canadian Hot 100 chart. The song sold over a million copies in August 2016 in the United States, and has sold 1,550,000 copies as of July 2017.  It was certified quadruple Platinum by the RIAA on March 15, 2018.

Music video
The music video was directed by TK McKamy and filmed at The Twelve Apostles, Australia. It premiered on April 29, 2016.

Charts

Weekly charts

Year-end charts

Decade-end charts

Certifications

Release history

References

2016 songs
2016 singles
Florida Georgia Line songs
Republic Nashville singles
Songs written by busbee
Song recordings produced by Joey Moi
Music videos directed by TK McKamy
Country ballads
Songs written by William Wiik Larsen
Republic Records singles
Billboard Hot Country Songs number-one singles of the year
2010s ballads